Geiger Mill is a historic grist mill located in Robeson Township, Berks County, Pennsylvania.  The mill was built in 1783, and is a -story, with basement, banked stucco-over-stone building. The adjacent miller's house was built about 1783, and is a -story, stucco-over-stone dwelling.  Also on the property is a contributing one-story, stucco-over-stone smokehouse.  The mill ceased operations about 1919.

It was listed on the National Register of Historic Places in 1990.

References

Grinding mills in Berks County, Pennsylvania
Grinding mills on the National Register of Historic Places in Pennsylvania
Industrial buildings completed in 1783
National Register of Historic Places in Berks County, Pennsylvania